Pagliaro is an Italian surname. Notable people with the surname include:

 Genny Pagliaro (born 1988), Italian female weightlifter
 Lou Pagliaro (1919–2009), American table tennis player
 Michel Pagliaro (born 1948), Canadian rock singer  

Italian-language surnames